Brieville is a town and commune in Madagascar. It belongs to the district of Tsaratanana, which is a part of Betsiboka Region. The population of the commune was estimated to be approximately 14,000 in a 2001 commune census.

Extraction of Chrome
The only mine of extraction of chromite is located in Brieville.  They are presently exploited by KRAOMA.

Primary and junior level secondary education are available in town. It is also a site of industrial-scale  mining. The majority 53.2% of the population of the commune are farmers, while an additional 43% receives their livelihood from raising livestock. The most important crop is rice, while other important products are maize and cassava.  Industry and services provide employment for 2.8% and 1% of the population, respectively.

References and notes 

Populated places in Betsiboka